Glastonbury is a 2006 rockumentary film directed by Julien Temple which details the history of the Glastonbury Festival from 1970 to 2005. It is the third attempt to make a film about the festival.  The film is made up of footage shot by Temple at the festival in 2002, 2003, 2004 and 2005 as well as footage sent in by festival goers after a request on websites and newspapers for footage. Temple had initially only agreed to make a film of the 2002 festival after organiser Michael Eavis expressed concern that that would be the last year of the festival. Temple then realised that he wanted to make a film detailing the full history of the festival. The film also includes footage shot by Channel 4 and the BBC during their coverage of the festival since 1994.

A series of special charity premieres took place on 13 April 2006 which included live performances from bands such as The Levellers.  The DVD has a fully interactive feature which allows viewers to make their own festival experience by selecting which live footage they would prefer to see in the film. The DVD was released on 17 July 2006 after a showing on BBC Two on 15 July 2006.

Footage for a re-evaluated edition of the film (to be shown on the BBC in 2012) was filmed in the summer of 2011 by Temple (in association with Somerset Film).

The DVD was authored by The Pavement.

See also
 Glastonbury Fayre (film)
 Glastonbury the Movie
 Glastonbury Anthems

References

External links
 Press release
 
 
 

Glastonbury Festival
2006 films
British documentary films
Documentary films about music festivals
British nonlinear narrative films
Films directed by Julien Temple
2006 documentary films
2000s English-language films
2000s British films
English-language documentary films